The following is a list of mainstream hospitals in Sri Lanka.

Central Province

Kandy District

Government Hospitals
Line Ministry Hospitals
National Hospital (Teaching), Kandy
Sirimavo Bandaranayake Specialized Children Hospital (Teaching), Peradeniya
General Hospital (Teaching), Peradeniya
District General Hoaspital Nawalapitiya - Nawalapitiya

 Hospitals of The Provincial Department of Health Services
Base Hospital (Teaching) Gampola
District General Theldeniya
DH Akurana
DH Ankumbura
PMCU Abagahapelessa
PMCU Atabage
DH Babaradeniya
DH Batumulla
DH Bokkawala
PMCU Deltota
DH Dolosbage
DH Dunhinna
DH Galagedara
DH Galaha
PMCU Gelioya
DH Galapihlla
DH Kadugannawa
DH Katugastota
DH Kahawatta
PMCU Kolongoda
PMCU Kotaligoda
DH Kuruduwatta
DH Jambuguhapitiya
DH Madolkale
DH Mampitiya
DH Marassana
DH Menikhinna
DH Medamahanuwara
DH Medawala
PMCU Morahena
PMCU Morayaya
DH Muruthalawa
DH Narampanawa
DH Hatharaliyadda
DH Hasalaka
DH Pussellawa
PMCU Pamunuwa
PMCU Pallegama
PMCU Panwilathanna
PMCU Sangarajapura
PMCU Handabowa

Private Hospitals
Kandy Nursing Home, Kandy
Lakeside Adventist Hospital, Kandy
Suwasewana Hospital, Kandy
Asiri Hospital, Kandy
MK Hospital, Gampola
Kandy Private Hospital, Kandy
Cayo Dental Hospital, Gelioya, Kandy

 Matale District 

 Government Hospitals 

 Line Ministry Hospitals 

 District General Hospital Matale

 Hospitals under Matale RDHS Divisional Hospitals Aluvihara
 Madipola
 Bandarapolawatta
 Maraka
 Devahuwa
 Matale North Dullawa
 Muwandeniya
 Elkaduwa
 Nalanda
 Galewela
 Opalgala
 Gammaduwa
 Ovilikanda
 Gurubebila
 Paldeniya
 Handungamuwa
 Pallepola
 Hattota Amuna
 Rattota
 Illukkumbura
 Sigiriya
 Kalundawa
 Ukuwela
 Koongahawela
 Wahakotte
 Laggala Pallegama
 Wewalawela
 Leliambe
 Yatawatta
 LenadoraMOH Offices Ambanganga
 Pallepola
 Dambulla
 Rattota
 Galewela
 Ukuwela
 Laggala Pallegama
 Wilgamuwa
 Matale
 Yatawatta
 Naula
 PallepolaOther Health Institutions Anti Malaria Campaign
 Regional MSD
 Chest Clinic
 STD ClinicPrivate Hospitals Kumudu Hospital
 Co-operative Hospital - Matale
 Matale Nursing Home
 Matale Medical Center
00t8t

Eastern Province

Northern Province

North Central Province

Anuradhapura District

Government Hospitals
Line Ministry Hospitals
DGH Anuradhapura(Teaching), මහ රොහල ශික්ෂන

Hospitals of The Provincial Department of Health Services
BH Kahatagasdigiliya
BH Padaviya
BH Kebethigollewa
DH Thalawa
BH Thamnutthegama
DH Kekirawa
DH Eppawala
DH Katiyawa
DH Mihinthale
DH Horowpothana
DH Madawachchiya
DH Thanthirimale
DH Galenbindunuwewa
DH Rajanganaya

Private hospitals
Royal Hospital, Anuradhapura
Suwa Shanthi Private Hospital, Anuradhapura
Walisundara Hospital, Anuradhapura
Co-Operative Hospital, Anuradhapura
Suwasewana Hospital, Anuradhapura

Military Hospitals
Victory Military Hospital, Anuradhapura

Polonnaruwa District

Government Hospitals
Line Ministry Hospitals
DGH Polonnaruwa (General)

Hospitals of The Provincial Department of Health Services
BH Medirigiriya
BH Welikanda
DH Hingurakgoda
DH Bakamoona
DH Manampitiya
DH Aralaganwia
RH Jayanthipura
RH Aththanakadawala

Specialized Hospitals
Sri Lanka-China friendship National Nephrology Hospital

Private Hospitals
Venus Lanka (Ajward) Hospital

North Western Province

Kurunegala District
Government Hospitals
Line Ministry Hospitals
Kurunegala Hospital, Teaching Hospital Kurunegala
Kuliyapitiya Hospital (Teaching)

Hospitals of The Provincial Department of Health Services
Alawwa Hospital, Alawwa (District Hospital)
Galgamuwa Hospital (District Base Hospital)
Kuliyapitiya Hospital, Kuliyapitiya (District Base)
Maho Hospital, Maho (Divisional)
Narammala Hospital, Narammala (Divisional)
Nickaweratiya Hospital, Nikaweratiya (District Base)
Polgahawela Hospital, Polgahawela (Divisional)
Warialpola Hospital, Wariyapola (Divisional)

Private Hospitals
Central Hospital (Nawinne), Kurnuegala
Cooperative Hospital, Kurunegala
Seth Sevana Hospital, Kurunegala
Miracle Health hospital, Kurunegala
sakukidentalhospital, Kurunegala 
Nawinna Hospital, Kurunegala

Puttalam District

Government Hospitals
Line Ministry Hospitals
Chilaw general hospital

Provincial council hospitals
Base Hospital(A), Puttalam
Base hospital(B), Marawila
Base Hospital(B), Kalpitiya
Base Hospital (B), Anamaduwa
Divisional Hospital(A), Dankotuwa
Divisional Hospital (B) Mundel
Divisional Hospital (B) Lunuwila
Divisional Hospital (B) Udappuwa
Divisional Hospital (C) Madampe
Divisional Hospital (C) Galmuruwa
Divisional Hospital (C) Anawilundawa
Dvisional Hospital (C) Mahakumbukkadawala
Divisional Hospital (C) Kottanthivu
Divisional Hospital (C) Mampuri
Divisional Hospital (C) Wanathawilluwa
Dvisional Hospital (C) Thabbowa
Divisional Hospital (C) Aluthgama
Divisional Hospital (C) Kottukachchiya
Divisional Hospital(C) Nawagaththegama

Primary Medical Care Units
PMCU Karathivu
PMCU Weppamadu
PMCU Al Quassimmi
PMCU Karamba
PMCU Puludivayal
PMCU Alankuda
PMCU Thalawila
PMCU kandakuda
PMCU Nagavillu
PMCU Hidayathnagar
PMCU Mudalakkuliya
PMCU Pallama
PMCU Madawakkulama
PMCU Wijayakatupotha
PMCU Wilpotha
PMCU Kokkawila
PMCU Thambagalla
PMCU Maningala
PMCU Naththandiya
PMCU Walahapitiya
PMCU Yatakalana
PMCU Kirimetiyana
PMCU Pothuwatawana
PMCU Koswatta
PMCU Thoduwawa
PMCU Wennappuwa
PMCU Nainamadama
PMCU Madurankuliya
PMCU Mellawa

Private Hospitals
 St. Anne's Nursing Home, Marawila
 Balasooriya Hospital, Puttalam 
 Suwana Private Hospital, Chilaw 
 Life Care Hospital, Wennappuwa 
 Kuwait Hospital, Nedunkulama
 Digasiri Hospital, Puttalam

Sabaragamuwa Province

Ratnapura District

Government Hospitals
 Rathnapura Teaching Hospital, Rathnapura (Teaching)
 Base Hospital, Embilipitiya
 Base Hospital, Balangoda (District Base)
 Rambukkana District Hospital

Private Hospitals
 Singhe Hospitals PLC ( Ratnapura)
 Cooperative Hospital, Ratnapura
Green Medicare Hospital, Embilipitiya
Navodya Private Hospital, Embilipitiya

Kegalle District

Government hospitals
Teaching hospital Kegalle Kegalle
base hospital, mawanella
base hospital, warakapola
base hospital, karawanella

private Hospitals
osro hospital kegalle
dimantha hospital kegalle
candella hospital kegalle 
osro hospital mawanella

Southern Province

Galle District

Government Hospitals
Line Ministry Hospitals
Karapitiya Teaching Hospital, Galle (Teaching)
Mahamodera Maternity Hospital, Galle (Special, Teaching)
Hospitals of The Provincial Department of Health Services
District Hospital, Baddegama (Grade A)
District Hospital,  Ambalangoda
District Hospital, Elpitiya
 District Hospital, Udugama
 District Hospital, Unawatuna
 District Hospital, Karandeniya
Base Hospital, Balapitiya (Grade A)

Private Hospitals
Co-operative Hospital, Galle
Asiri Hospital Galle (Previously named as Hemas Southern Hospital), Galle
Roseth Hospital, Ambalangoda
Ruhunu Hospital, Galle
Suvana Suva Madiya Hospital, Ambalangoda
Queensbury Hospitals, Karapitiya, Galle
Baddegama Medical Center, Baddegama

Hambantota District

Government Hospital
Hambantota District General Hospital, Hambantota
Tissamaharama Base Hospital, Debarawewa
Tangalle Base Hospital, Tangalle
Walasmulla Base Hospital, Walasmulla
Ambalantota Divisional Hospital, Ambalantota
Angunukolapelessa Divisional Hospital, Angunukolapelessa
Beliatta Divisional Hospital, Beliatta
Sooriyawewa Divisional Hospital, Sooriyawewa

Private Hospitals
Holton Hospital, Walasmulla
Southern Lanka Hospital, Tangalle
Arogya Hospital, Tangalle

Matara District

Government Hospitals
Line Ministry Hospitals
Kamburupitiya Base Hospital, Kamburupitiya
Matara General Hospital, Matara
Gangodagama Hospital (Hakmana)
Allewela Hospital (Allewela)

 Hospitals of The Provincial Department of health Services

Private Hospitals
Asiri Hospital, Matara
Co-operative Hospital, Matara 
Medicare Hospital, Matara 
Mohotti Private Hospital, Matara
Matara Nursing Home, Matara

Western Province

Colombo District

Gampaha District

Kalutara District

Uva Province

Badulla District

Government Hospitals
Badulla Provincial General Hospital, Badulla
Diyatalawa Base Hospital, Diyatalawa
Mahiyanganaya Base Hospital, Mahiyangana
Welimada Base Hospital, Welimada
Bandarawela District Hospital, Bandarawela
Haldummulla District Hospital, Haldummulla
Haputhale District Hospital, Haputhale
Kandaketiya District Hospital, Kandaketiya
Koslanda District Hospital, Koslanda
Lunugala District Hospital, Lunugala
Matigahathenna District Hospital, Matigahathenna
Meegahakiula District Hospital, Meegahakiula
Passara District Hospital, Passara
Uva Paranagama District Hospital, Uva Paranagama
Uraniya District Hospital, Uraniya
Kahataruppa Divisional Hospital, Kahataruppa
Mirahawatte Divisional Hospital, Mirahawatte
Ettampitiya Divisional Hospital, Ettampitiya
Boralanda Divisional Hospital, Boralanda
Wewegama Divisional Hospital, Wewegama
Ekiriyankumbura Divisional Hospital, Ekiriyankumbura
Nedungamuwa Divisional Hospital, Nedungamuwa
Bogahakumbura Divisional Hospital, Bogahakumbura
Kendagolla Divisional Hospital, Kendagolla
Kandegedara Divisional Hospital, Kandegedara
Sprinwelly Divisional Hospital, Sprinwelly
Robery Divisional Hospital, Robery
Hopton Divisional Hospital, Hopton
Ury Divisional Hospital, Ury
Glenor Divisional Hospital, Glenor
Demodara Divisional Hospital, Demodara
Dambethenna Divisional Hospital, Dambethenna
Kanaverella Divisional Hospital, Kanaverella
Uva Highland Divisional Hospital, Uva Highland
Downside Divisional Hospital, Downside
Hakgala Divisional Hospital, Hakgala
Poonagala Divisional Hospital, Poonagala
Sarniya Divisional Hospital, Sarniya
Unagolla Divisional Hospital, Unagolla
Thelbedda Divisional Hospital, Thelbedda
Mahadowa Divisional Hospital, Mahadowa
Kurkeels Divisional Hospital, Kurkeels
Galauda Peripheral Unit, Galauda
Meedumpitiya Rehabilitation Centre, Meedumpitiya
Bibilegama Central Dispensry, Bibilegama
Ballaketuwa Central Dispensry, Ballaketuwa
Haliela Central Dispensry, Haliela
Halpe Central Dispensry, Halpe
Keppetipola Central Dispensry, Keppetipola
Liyangahawela Central Dispensry, Liyangahawela
Namunukula Central Dispensry, Namunukula
Dambana Central Dispensry, Dambana
Lunuwaththa Central Dispensry, Lunuwaththa
Bathalayaya Central Dispensry, Bathalayaya
Nagadeepa Central Dispensry, Nagadeepa
Hebarawa Central Dispensry, Hebarawa
Hewanakumbura Central Dispensry, Hewanakumbura
Rilpola Central Dispensry, Rilpola
Ella Central Dispensry, Ella
Thaldena Central Dispensry, Thaldena

Private Hospitals
Central Hospital, Badulla

Monaragala District

Government Hospitals
Monaragala District General Hospital, Monaragala 
Wellawaya Base Hospital, Wellawaya
Bibila Base Hospital, Bibila
Siyambalanduwa Base Hospital, Siyambalanduwa
Badalkumbura District Hospital, Badalkumbura
Buththala District Hospital, Buththala
Medagama District Hospital, Medagama
Inginiyagala District Hospital, Inginiyagala
Katharagama District Hospital, Katharagama
Thanamalvila District Hospital, Thanamalvila
Hambegamuva District Hospital, Hambegamuva
Handapanagala Rural Hospital, Handapanagala
Sevanagala Rural Hospital, Sevanagala
Hingurukaduwa Rural Hospital, Hingurukaduwa
Ethimale Rural Hospital, Ethimale
Pitakumbura Rural Hospital, Pitakumbura
Okkampitiya Rural Hospital, Okkampitiya
Dambagalla Rural Hospital, Dambagalla

Private Hospitals
Monaragala Nursing Home, Monaragala
Uva Private Hospital, Wellawaya'''

References